Jerome Saganowich (born July 5, 1964) is an American professional wrestler best known by his wrestling name Jerry Sags. He is a member of the tag team The Nasty Boys with partner and long-term friend Brian Knobbs.

Early life and education
Sags was born May 7, 1964, in Allentown, Pennsylvania. He attended and graduated from Whitehall High School in Whitehall Township, Pennsylvania in the Lehigh Valley region of eastern Pennsylvania. While at Whitehall High School, Sags met Brian Knobbs. The two became friends and went on to establish The Nasty Boys in 1986.

Career

Sags started his American Wrestling Association career as a referee in 1985. In 1986, he and Brian Knobbs formed The Nasty Boys, a tag team that initially wrestled out of Memphis, Tennessee. The team until moved to Championship Wrestling from Florida, where they won the Tag Team Titles five times from 1988 through 1990. In 1990, they went to the NWA's Jim Crockett Promotions, which had been purchased by Ted Turner and would be renamed World Championship Wrestling before The Nasty Boys left a few months later. They feuded with Rick and Scott Steiner over the U.S. Tag Team Titles, but could not defeat them. In late 1990, they moved to the World Wrestling Federation, where they were managed by Jimmy Hart. They won the World Tag Team titles from The Hart Foundation before feuding with and losing the titles to the Legion of Doom. Knobbs and Sags then feuded with all of the WWF's top face tag teams, including The Rockers and The Bushwhackers. They turned face in the fall of 1992 to feud with Jimmy Hart's Money Inc. over the tag team titles, but were unable to recapture the gold.

They left the WWF for WCW in 1993 and were managed by Missy Hyatt, who helped lead them to world tag team titles. Hyatt later resigned as their manager, and they went on to feud with Harlem Heat, The Blue Bloods, and the team of Dick Slater and Bunkhouse Buck. In 1996, they were tricked by the nWo into thinking they were going to become members, but were attacked as soon as they received their shirts. Sags had been injured previously and retired as a result of the injury.

Sags later returned to wrestling in 2001 as a trainer and with Knobbs as The Nasty Boys to wrestle in the short-lived X Wrestling Federation and the World Wrestling Council in Puerto Rico. He retired again after the promotion folded in 2002. but returned with Knobbs to reform The Nasty Boys on June 16, 2007, at Pro Wrestling Unplugged. On November 20, 2007, The Nasty Boys competed at the SmackDown! tapings from Tampa, Florida, wrestling in their first WWE match in years. The match was disastrous, and the team was accused of being unprofessionally stiff with their opponents, Dave Taylor and Drew McIntyre.

On January 4, 2010, The Nasty Boys made an appearance on Total Nonstop Action Wrestling (TNA)'s TNA Impact!, feuding with Team 3D. On the January 21 edition of Impact!, the Nasty Boys competed in their first match for TNA, defeating the team of Eric Young and Kevin Nash. At Against All Odds, The Nasty Boys defeated Team 3D in a tag team match, when Jimmy Hart made his return to the company and interfered in the match on the Nasty Boys' behalf. On the February 25 edition of Impact!, Team 3D defeated The Nasty Boys in a tables match with Jesse Neal interfering on Team 3D's behalf. The Nasty Boys and Hart continued their feud with Team 3D, defeating them and the returning Brother Runt, a replacement for Jesse Neal who The Nastys attacked prior to a six-man tag team match. After the match, Neal attacked the Nastys and helped Team 3D throw Sags through a table.

On March 29, 2010, The Nasty Boys were released by TNA following an incident at a TNA function attended by Spike TV executives.

Personal life
Sags and his wife Laura have four children, daughters Chloe and Madison, and sons Seve and Jax. They reside in Treasure Island, Florida near Brian Knobbs and Hulk Hogan. Sags' sister-in-law was married to the late pro wrestler Dusty Rhodes.

In 2011, Sags appeared in an episode of Man v. Food Nation in the show's Tampa, Florida episode, where he won his challenge.

Championships and accomplishments
Cauliflower Alley Club
Tag Team Award (2023) – with Brian Knobbs
Championship Wrestling International
CWI Tag Team Championship (1 time) – with Brian Knobbs
Continental Wrestling Association
AWA Southern Tag Team Championship (2 times) – with Brian Knobbs
North American Wrestling Association / South Atlantic Pro Wrestling
NAWA/SAPW Tag Team Championship (1 time) – with Brian Knobbs
NWA Florida
FCW Tag Team Championship (5 times) – with Brian Knobbs
Pro Wrestling Illustrated
PWI Tag Team of the Year award in 1994 – with Brian Knobbs
PWI ranked him # 420 of the 500 best singles wrestlers during the "PWI Years" in 2003
PWI ranked him # 53 of the 100 best tag teams of the "PWI Years" with Brian Knobbs in 2003.
Professional Wrestling Federation
PWF Tag Team Championship (1 time) – with Brian Knobbs
World Championship Wrestling
WCW World Tag Team Championship (3 times) – with Brian Knobbs
World Wrestling Federation
WWF Tag Team Championship (1 time) – with Brian Knobbs
X Wrestling Federation
XWF World Tag Team Championship (1 time) – with Brian Knobbs

References

External links

1964 births
Living people
20th-century professional wrestlers
21st-century professional wrestlers
American male professional wrestlers
NWA Florida Tag Team Champions
People from Treasure Island, Florida
Professional wrestlers from Pennsylvania
Professional wrestling referees
Sportspeople from Allentown, Pennsylvania
WCW World Tag Team Champions
Whitehall High School (Pennsylvania) alumni
New World Order (professional wrestling) members